Nucetto is a comune (municipality) in the Province of Cuneo in the Italian region Piedmont, located about  southeast of Turin and about  east of Cuneo.

The municipality of Nucetto contains the frazioni (subdivisions, mainly villages and hamlets) Villa, Nicolini, Caramelli, Livrato, Cadirei, Roatta, and Stra' veia.

Nucetto borders the following municipalities: Bagnasco, Battifollo, Ceva, and Perlo.

Demographic evolution

References

Cities and towns in Piedmont